A Crawford burner is a device used to test burn rate (chemistry) of solid propellants. It is also known as a strand burner.

A Crawford burner consists of a small pressure vessel in which a thin bar of propellant to be tested is mounted on a stand. The bar is coated with an external coating so that burning cross-sectional surface is restricted. The propellant is ignited at one end and burned to the other end. Wires are embedded in the propellant at certain intervals of distance so that when the propellant burning reaches the wire, it sends off electrical signals. These wires are connected to a chronometer and the electrical signals are recorded at different time intervals so that burning rate can be measured.

The burning rate measured from a strand burner is typically 4 to 12% less than actual burning rate observed in rockets. This is because the high temperature conditions in actual rockets are not simulated. The heat transfer characteristics are also different. Nevertheless, the strand burner experiment is easy to perform, can be repeated, and is a qualitative picture of the burning rate is obtained. The temperature sensitivity of burning rate is usually calculated from strand burner test data.

See also
 Solid rocket

References
 George P. Sutton and Oscar Biblarz. Rocket Propulsion Elements. John Wiley and Sons, Inc. .

External links
Crawford Burner System (Strand Burner)

Rocketry